Lavumisa is a town located in the Shiselweni district of southern Eswatini.

It is a border crossing point to the neighbouring town of Golela in South Africa. Highway MR8 and the railway cross here.

References

Populated places in Shiselweni Region
Eswatini–South Africa border crossings